Struthers or Struther may refer to:

People 
Struther Arnott (1934–2013), Scottish molecular biologist and chemist, former Principal and Vice-Chancellor of the University of St Andrews
Betsy Struthers (born 1951), Canadian poet and novelist
Cyntha Struthers (born c. 1954), Canadian statistician
Jan Struther (1901–1953), pen name of English writer Joyce Anstruther, best known for her character Mrs. Miniver and a number of hymns
John Struthers (anatomist) (1823–1899), Professor of Anatomy at the University of Aberdeen, Scotland
John Struthers (poet) (1776–1853), Scottish poet and writer
J. P. Struthers (1865–1915), Scottish preacher, pastor and children's author
Karen Struthers (born 1963), Australian politician
Sally Struthers (born 1947), American actress and spokeswoman
Stan Struthers (born 1959), Canadian politician
Crispin Struthers, Oscar-nominated film editor
Nora Jane Struthers (born 1983), American singer-songwriter

Places 
Struthers, Ohio, a city
Struthers Lake, Saskatchewan, Canada

See also
Strother (disambiguation)
Strothers, a surname